The fringe-backed fire-eye (Pyriglena atra), also known as Swainson's fire-eye, is a rare species of bird in the antbird family that is endemic to Brazil. Names in other languages include Olho-de-fogo-rendado and papa-taoca-da-bahia in Portuguese, Batará de Swainson and Ojodefuego de Bahía in Spanish, Alapi noir and Priglène à manteau tacheté in French, and Fleckenmantel-Feuerauge and Fleckenmantel-Feueraugef in German.

Taxonomy
The fringe-backed fire-eye was described by the English naturalist William Swainson in 1825 and given the binomial name Drymophila atra. The current genus Pyriglena was introduced by the German ornithologist Jean Cabanis in 1847.

Description
This bird is about 17.5 cm long. It has red eyes. The male is black and has a patch of white-edged black feathers on its back. The female is reddish-brown with brown underparts, a black tail, and a white throat. The song is a number of whistling fíu sounds and the alarm call is a loud peerit, rising at the end.

Behaviour

Breeding
The nest is on the ground and well camouflaged. It is spherical with a covering of dry leaves and an internal lining of fibers from piaçava palms. Both male and female incubate and provide parental care.

Feeding
This bird forages in tangled vegetation within three meters of the ground, sometimes feeding higher in the canopy. It may be solitary or it may forage in pairs or small family groups. Food items include cockroaches, grasshoppers, winged ants, caterpillars, and geckos. Frogs are also eaten. The bird may follow army ants, which flush the prey items into the open.

Distribution and habitat
The bird is endemic to Brazil where it is a resident of a small strip of the South American Atlantic Forest biome. It inhabits the understory at the edges of lowland primary and secondary tropical forests. It lives in dense forest habitat, avoiding open and sunny areas. The species' range extends from southern Sergipe to north-eastern Bahia, covering about 5000 km² of fragmented habitat.

Status and conservation
The total population is estimated to be between 1000 and 2500 individuals. It is thought to be declining rapidly due to the loss of habitat. The United States Fish and Wildlife Service listed it as an endangered species in 2010. It is a protected species under Brazilian law.

References

fringe-backed fire-eye
Birds of the Atlantic Forest
Endemic birds of Brazil
fringe-backed fire-eye
Taxonomy articles created by Polbot